Kurmangazy (Qūrmanğazy, قۇرمانعازى), before 2018 Ganyushkino (Ganiuşkın, گانيۇشكٸن; , Ganyushkino) is the administrative center of the Kurmangazy District, Atyrau Region, Kazakhstan. Kurmangazy is in the west of Atyrau and close to the north shore of the Caspian Sea and the Kazakhstan–Russia border. It is in the area west of the Ural River and thus in the European part of Kazakhstan. Population:

References

External links
Republic of Kazakhstan, Atyrau City Information Web Site
A Map of Kazakhstan by UN

Populated places in Atyrau Region